Whitehouse magazine, also known as Whitehouse International, was a British pornographic magazine originally published by David Sullivan, and later sold to Gold Star Publications. It was first published in 1974. Billed as "The International Quality Glamour Magazine", it was substantially more explicit than its predecessors, showing uncensored images of genitalia.

Although reputed to have been named after anti-pornography campaigner Mary Whitehouse, the magazine contained a disclaimer saying that its name had nothing to do with her. The model Mary Millington made numerous appearances in the magazine.

Although Whitehouse was one of Sullivan's most successful magazines, sales fell over the years. As of 2001, sales had declined to around £250,000 per year. Publication ceased in 2008.

The industrial music band Whitehouse are named after the magazine.

References

Pornographic magazines published in the United Kingdom
Men's magazines published in the United Kingdom
1974 establishments in the United Kingdom
Magazines established in 1974
Magazines disestablished in 2008
Defunct magazines published in the United Kingdom